Vladimir Novikov (born 9 June, 1966, Tambov) is a Russian political figure and a deputy of the 7th and 8th State Dumas. 

Novikov started his political career in 1995 when he was appointed deputy of the Artyom City Duma of the 1st convocation. In 1997, he started working as the Deputy head of administration of the city of Artyom. In 2000, Novikov served as acting head of the Artyom city administration and, a year later, he officially became the mayor. In 2016-2021, he served as deputy of the 7th State Duma from the Primorsky Krai constituency. In 2021, he was re-elected for the 8th State Duma.

Awards  
Order "For Merit to the Fatherland"
Order of Friendship

References

1962 births
Living people
United Russia politicians
21st-century Russian politicians
Eighth convocation members of the State Duma (Russian Federation)
Seventh convocation members of the State Duma (Russian Federation)